Brassica nigra, or black mustard, is an annual plant cultivated for its dark-brown-to-black seeds, which are commonly used as a spice. It is native to tropical regions of North Africa, temperate regions of Europe, and parts of Asia.

Description

It is an upright plant, with large stalked leaves. They are covered with hairs or bristles at the base, but on the stem smoother. It blooms in summer, from May (in the UK) onwards. The flowers have four yellow petals, which are twice as long as the sepals. Each stem has around four flowers at the top, forming a ring around the stem. Later, the plant forms long seed pods, that contain four rounded seeds.

Taxonomy
It was formally described by Karl Koch in "Deutschl. Fl." (or Deutschlands Flora) ed.3 on page 713 in 1833. This was based on a description by the Swedish botanist Carl Linnaeus.

The Latin specific epithet nigra is derived from the Latin word for black. This is due to the black seeds.

Distribution and habitat
It is native to tropical regions of North Africa, temperate regions of Europe and parts of Asia.

Range
It is found in North Africa, within Algeria, Egypt, Eritrea, Libya, Ethiopia, Morocco and Tunisia. Within Asia it is found in Afghanistan, Armenia, the Caucasus, China (in the provinces of Gansu, Jiangsu, Qinghai, Xinjiang and Xizang), Cyprus, India, Iran, Iraq, Israel, Kazakhstan, Lebanon, Syria and Turkey. In eastern Europe, it is found within Belarus, Moldova and Ukraine. In middle Europe, it is in Austria, Belgium, Czech Republic, Germany, Hungary, Netherlands, Poland, Slovakia and Switzerland. In northern Europe, in Ireland and United Kingdom. In southeastern Europe, within Albania, Bosnia and Herzegovina, Bulgaria, Croatia, Greece, Italy, Montenegro, North Macedonia, Romania, Serbia and Slovenia. Also in southwestern Europe, it is found in France and Spain.

It was introduced to the Pacific coast of North America and is considered an invasive species.

Uses
More than 2,000 years ago, the plant was used as a condiment; it was mentioned by the Roman author Columella in the 1st century A.D. The plant leaves were also pickled in vinegar. In 13th century France the seeds were ground and used. They were mixed with unfermented grape juice (must) to create "moût-ardent" ("burning must"). This became later "moutarde", or mustard in English.

A spice is generally made from ground seeds of the plant, with the seed coats removed. The small (1 mm) seeds are hard and vary in color from dark brown to black. They are flavorful, although they have almost no aroma. The seeds are commonly used in Indian cuisine, for example in curry, where it is known as rai. The seeds are usually thrown into hot oil or ghee, after which they pop, releasing a characteristic nutty flavor. The seeds have a significant amount of fatty oil, mainly oleic acid. This oil is used often as cooking oil in India, where it is called "sarson ka tel".

The young leaves, buds and flowers are edible. In Ethiopia, where the plant is cultivated as a vegetable in Gondar, Harar and Shewa, the shoots and leaves are consumed cooked and the seeds used as a spice. Its Amharic name is senafitch.

Black mustard is thought to be the seed mentioned by Jesus in the Parable of the Mustard Seed.

Since the 1950s, black mustard has become less popular as compared to brown mustard, because some cultivars of brown mustard have seeds that can be mechanically harvested in a more efficient manner.

Folk medicine
In the UK, the plant was used to make "hot mustard baths", which would aid people with colds.
Ground seeds of the plant mixed with honey are widely used in eastern Europe as cough suppressant. It consisted in mixing ground mustard seeds with flour and water, and creating a cataplasm with the paste. This poultice was put on the chest or the back and left until the person felt a stinging sensation. Mustard poultice could also be used to aid muscular pains.

Similar plants

Despite their similar common names, black mustard and white mustard (genus Sinapis) are not closely related. Black mustard belongs to the same genus as cabbage and turnips.

B. nigra also resembles Hirschfeldia incana, or hoary mustard, (formerly Brassica geniculata), which is a perennial plant.

See also
 Mustard plant
 Mustard seed
 Sinapis

References

External links

 Entry in Gernot Katzer's spice pages, with pictures and detailed information
 Entry in Illinois Wildflowers
 Mustards

nigra
Spices
Medicinal plants of Asia
Medicinal plants of Europe
Flora of Europe
Flora of North Africa
Flora of Eritrea
Flora of Ethiopia
Flora of Afghanistan
Flora of Armenia
Flora of the Caucasus
Flora of China
Flora of Iran
Flora of Iraq
Flora of Israel
Flora of Kazakhstan
Flora of Lebanon and Syria
Flora of Palestine (region)
Leaf vegetables
Oil seeds
Taxa named by Carl Linnaeus